Mount Liberty is the name of some places in the United States:

Mountains
Mount Liberty (New Hampshire), in the White Mountains

Communities
Mount Liberty, Indiana
Mount Liberty, Ohio
Mount Liberty, West Virginia